Bjarkey Gunnarsdóttir is an Icelandic politician. She has served as a member of the Parliament of Iceland since 2013, representing the North East

References

Living people
1965 births
Bjarkey Gunnarsdottir
Bjarkey Gunnarsdottir
Bjarkey Gunnarsdottir
Bjarkey Gunnarsdottir